The fashioning of jewelry and the usage of precious jewels and metals under the Ming Dynasty was conducted by a select number of people in the occupation of jeweler. Typically born into the profession, jewelers worked in workshops and, using a myriad of techniques, creating many beautiful objects. They were primarily commissioned by the Royal Family and Royal court, although occasionally they created pieces for other members of the nobility or for Buddhist and Taoist temples. Adapting the system from the previous Yuan Dynasty, the Ming Dynasty mandated all artisanal professions, such as that of a jeweler, hereditary and binding from generation to generation. Beginning under the first Ming Emperor, the Hongwu Emperor, a complex system revolving around artisan craftsmanship developed in order to both fulfill the quotas imposed by the Ming Court as well as to protect the rights of the individual artisan and his family. Guilds and other partnerships also developed in order to protect the different artisans themselves. Within the Royal Court, there was also the Imperial Jewelry Service, which meant that there was both always some sort of official oversight over the jeweler profession as well as a steady demand for the labor of a jeweler.

One technique commonly used by jewelers during the Ming period was filigree. Jewelers would twist together thin pieces of metal, such as gold or silver, to create intricate patterns and beautiful shapes. Hairpins provide some of the best example of filigree work during the Ming period. These pieces were delicate and appeared almost otherworldly in their complexity. Through hairpins one can often get a glance at a jeweler's best work, as hairpins were highly prized by the elite women in the Ming Court. and the level of design and grandeur of the hairpin represented the status of the lady it adorned. Another technique often associated with jewelers in the Ming times was gem embedding. Beautifully cut gemstones, imported from Southeast Asia, would be placed in designs of delicate gold filigree, creating truly ornate pieces.

Gold, silver, and jade were some of the most commonly used materials by the jewelers in Ming times. Assorted gemstones and pearls were also used frequently along with the other materials. For the members of the Royal Court, a variety of headdresses, belts, trinkets, and other ornaments worn to denote status were made from a combination of silks and gold and other precious jewels. Beyond jewelry and other wearable goods, jewelers also created ornate items such as cups, bowls, trays, and tweezers for use within the Ming Court. In order to procure the raw materials to create these highly sought after products, jewelers had to turn to the court eunuchs who oversaw the mines, imports from surrounding regions, as well as tributes from neighboring states. As evidenced by the abundance of gold and silver products found in Ming tombs, many of these items were so valued that they were chosen or commissioned to go into the afterlife. It is from some of these pieces, preserved in the tombs, that one can see some of the best work of jewelers during the Ming Dynasty.

These techniques, practices, and usage of precious metals and gemstones did not originate under the Ming Dynasty; rather, it is thought that the particular styles were inherited from the previous Yuan Dynasty, the Mongols. Under the Ming Dynasty jewelers further refined and explored these techniques to create pieces distinctive of the Ming period.

References

Ming dynasty art
Jewellery